Pomaderris mediora is a species of flowering plant in the family Rhamnaceae and is endemic to the central coast of New South Wales. It is a low-lying or erect shrub with hairy new growth, narrowly elliptic to lance-shaped leaves with the narrower end towards the base, and panicles of cream-coloured flowers.

Description
The upper surface of the leaves is glabrous and the lower surface is densely covered with greyish to rust-coloured hairs.

Taxonomy
Pomaderris mediora was first formally described in 1997 by Neville Grant Walsh and Fiona Coates in the journal Muelleria from specimens Walsh collected on Turimetta Head in 1994. The specific epithet (meridora) means "middle coast", referring to the species' distribution on the central coast.

Distribution and habitat
This pomaderris grows in heath and scrub on ridges and headlands in Narrabeen sandstone and shale from the mouth of the Hawkesbury River to Bulli.

References

Flora of New South Wales
mediora
Plants described in 1997
Taxa named by Neville Grant Walsh